Dendrodoris guttata is a species of sea slug, a dorid nudibranch, a marine gastropod mollusc in the family Dendrodorididae.

Distribution 
This species occurs in Australia.

References

External links 
 https://web.archive.org/web/20100615043925/http://seaslugforum.net/factsheet.cfm?base=dendgutt
 

Dendrodorididae
Gastropods described in 1917